Surangel S. Whipps Jr. (born 9 August 1968) is a Palauan businessman and politician, who has served as the president of Palau since 2021. He served as senator from 2008 to 2016. He is from Ngatpang state, Republic of Palau. Whipps assumed office as the President of Palau on 21 January 2021.

Early life and education 

Whipps was born in Baltimore, Maryland, to Surangel Whipps Sr. and a mother who was born in Maryland.

He has a degree in Business Administration and Economics from Andrews University and an MBA from University of California, Los Angeles. In addition, he heads a chain of Palauan supermarkets.

He ran against his brother-in-law, President Thomas Remengesau Jr., who was running for re-election, in the 2016 Palauan general election Remengesau received 5109 votes while Whipps won 4854 votes.

Spouse and children 
Whipps married Valerie Esang Remengesau in 1999 and the couple had four children.

Tenure
Whipps ran for president in the 2020 presidential election and defeated Vice-president Raynold Oilouch in a campaign in which he stressed tax reforms and the creation of additional sources of revenue. In an interview with the Guardian, then President-elect Whipps Jr. made the statement that Palau would more strongly oppose the actions of the Chinese government including illegal fishing and trespassing in Palauan waters as well as vowing to maintain the country's recognition of Taiwan. In addition, he proposed to distribute the COVID-19 vaccine amongst Palau's population, with an emphasis on healthcare workers.

During the COP26 meeting in Glasgow, Scotland, Whipps said "We are drowning, and our only hope is the life-ring you are holding", strongly criticizing world powers in his speech. On 28 September 2022, on the occasion of the state funeral for Shinzo Abe, Japan's former prime minister, in Tokyo, Whipps was one of only seven heads of state which met with Japanese Emperor Naruhito.

In October 2022, President Whipps visited Taiwan again. He arrived in Taiwan on 5 October and was welcomed by President Tsai Ing-wen when he stepped off the plane. This was his second trip to visit Taiwan during his presidency.

References 

1968 births
Living people
Members of the Senate of Palau
Palauan people of American descent
People from Ngatpang
People from Baltimore
Presidents of Palau